Harry B. Sohal (December 10, 1946 – November 15, 1994) was an Indian-born provincial level politician from Alberta, Canada. After immigrating to Canada in 1971, Sohal earned an MA and then a PhD in history from the University of Waterloo in 1979. He worked as a consultant and small businessman before entering public life.

Political career
Sohal was elected to the Legislative Assembly of Alberta in the 1993 Alberta general election. He won the Calgary McCall electoral district holding it for the Progressive Conservatives. Sohal died a year into his first term in office on November 15, 1994 as a result of a heart attack while jogging.

References

1946 births
1994 deaths
Businesspeople from Calgary
Canadian politicians of Indian descent
Politicians from Calgary
Progressive Conservative Association of Alberta MLAs